Marco Roth (born 1974) in New York, New York is a co-founder and editor of n+1 magazine.

Life
Roth is a graduate of The Dalton School and Columbia University. In 2009, he was awarded a Pew Fellowship in the Arts, and the Roger Shattuck prize for literary criticism in 2011. He lives in Philadelphia.

Essays and criticism
His work has appeared in the Dissent, New York Times, Harper's, The London Review of Books, The Times Literary Supplement and the Nation. 
His memoir, The Scientists: A Family Romance, about his father's death and "truths and limitations in literature", came out in 2012.

Selected works
"I don't Want Your Revolution" London Review of Books. 20 February 2014.
"Among The Believers" Harper's Magazine. October, 2015.
"Belgrade: History-of-the-Present" Places Journal, October 2015.

Selected Articles published in n+1
"Derrida: An Autothanatography" A memoir/obituary about Roth/Derrida.
"I'm with Stupid" - About Michael Moore and our values."
"On Torture And Parenting" On the psychology of American torturers and behavioral therapists.
"Attack of the Clones"  On Houellebecq, Ishiguro, and the idea of the clone in contemporary fiction.
"Lower the Voting Age!" Argument to lower the voting age to 16.
"Rise of the Neuronovel" Neurology vs. Modernism in Contemporary Fiction.
"Throwback Throwdown" On the rhetoric of "sampling" in contemporary writing.
"The Information Essay" On the informational sublime in the contemporary essay.
"The Drone Philosopher" On Drones and the imagination.

Interviews
 "Young Critics: Marco Roth". Full Stop. 22 June 2011.
 "Conversations With Writers Braver Than Me #14." The Rumpus. January 4, 2013.

References

External links
"Franz the Obscure" - Kafka: The Decisive Years,' by Reiner Stach  Review by Roth in The New York Times, (Published: January 1, 2006).
"Shalimar the Clown" Review of Salman Rushdie in Times Literary Supplement.
"Marco Roth: The Rise of the Neuronovel", The Book Store, 3 February 2010
http://www.npr.org/2012/09/12/161003574/the-scientists-a-fathers-lie-and-a-familys-legacy
https://newrepublic.com/article/107405/marco-roth-the-scientists-a-family-romance
‘The Oppermanns’ Brings Us Some Bad News From 1933 Review of Lion Feuchtwanger’s novel in Tablet (Published: June 30, 2022).

1974 births
American literary critics
Living people
Pew Fellows in the Arts

Columbia College (New York) alumni
Dalton School alumni
American magazine editors
American literary editors
American magazine founders